"Provide" is a song by American rapper G-Eazy, featuring vocals from American singer-songwriter Chris Brown and English singer-songwriter Mark Morrison. It was released through RCA Records as a standalone single on February 5, 2021. The song was produced by the duo of Cardiak and Hitmaka who previously worked on different songs from Brown's albums Heartbreak on a Full Moon and Indigo. The three artists wrote the song alongside the producers with the exception of the latter producer and Gabrielle Nowee, Benjamin Wilson, Douglas Ford, and Drew Love. It was later included on the deluxe edition of G-Eazy's fourth studio album These Things Happen Too.

Background and composition
G-Eazy has collaborated with Chris Brown twice before "Provide" was released, the first time on G-Eazy's 2015 single "Drifting" and the second time on Brown's 2019 single "Wobble Up", with additional features from Canadian rapper and singer Tory Lanez and American rapper and singer Nicki Minaj, respectively. However, it serves as the first collaboration between G-Eazy and Mark Morrison and the first collaboration between Brown and Morrison. The song also samples Morrison's 1996 single "Return of the Mack", from his debut studio album of the same name.

Release and promotion
On February 1, 2021, G-Eazy revealed the collaboration between himself and Chris Brown that would be released that same week through an Instagram post. The following day, the cover art for the song was revealed, and that also revealed that Mark Morrison would be a part of the collaboration and then confirmed the release date with a comment on his own post. Finally, two days before the song was released, he revealed a small clip of the accompanying visuals.

Music video
The official music video for the song premiered alongside its release on February 5, 2021. It was directed by Edgar Esteves and shot in Los Angeles, California. It contains a large house party that shows them in the company of women and dancing.

Critical reception
Brandon Caldwell from HipHopDX claimed that the video shows G-Eazy "wooing a woman he met at a burger stop, taking her on a shopping spree in a send-up to the '90s coming of age comedy Clueless" and Chris Brown "being one of the main stars of the party, going from inside to the front yard to roof and more".

Credits and personnel
Credits adapted from Tidal.

 G-Eazy – lead vocals, songwriting
 Chris Brown – featured vocals, songwriting
 Mark Morrison – featured vocals, songwriting
 Cardiak – production, songwriting
 Hitmaka – production, songwriting
 Paul Cabbin – production
 Gabrielle Nowee – songwriting
 Benjamin Wilson – songwriting
 Douglas Ford – songwriting
 Drew Love – songwriting
 Jaycen Joshua – mixing
 Patrizio Pigliapoco – mixing, recording
 Chris Athens – mastering
 Shawn "Source" Jarrett – recording
 DJ Riggins – assistant engineering
 Jacob Richards – assistant engineering
 Mike Seaberg – assistant engineering

Charts

Release history

References

2021 songs
2021 singles
G-Eazy songs
Chris Brown songs
Mark Morrison songs
Songs written by G-Eazy
Songs written by Chris Brown
Songs written by Mark Morrison
Songs written by Cardiak
Songs written by Hitmaka
RCA Records singles